William Frederick Bull (December 31, 1903 – January 22, 1993) was a Canadian diplomat. He was Ambassador Extraordinary and Plenipotentiary to Japan (1962–1968) and then to the Netherlands.

References

External links 
 Foreign Affairs and International Trade Canada Complete List of Posts

1903 births
1993 deaths
Place of birth missing
Ambassadors of Canada to the Netherlands
Ambassadors of Canada to Japan